is a Japanese footballer who playing as a left back and currently play for FC Tokyo of the J1 League.

Club career
In 2018, Bangnagande begin first professional career with FC Tokyo U-23 in J3 League until 2019.

In 2020, Bangnagande promote to top team of FC Tokyo. On 27 September of the same year, he debut against Sagan Tosu in J1 League.

International career
Bangnagande has represented Japan at youth level since 2018, having played up to the Japan U20s. 

In March 2023, he was called up to the Japan national team for the first time by manager Hajime Moriyasu to play in the 2023 Kirin Challenge Cup.

Personal life
Bangnagande was born in Adachi, Tokyo to a Ghanaian father and a Japanese mother.

Career statistics

Club

Notes

References

External links

2001 births
Living people
Association football people from Tokyo
Japanese footballers
Japanese people of Ghanaian descent
Sportspeople of Ghanaian descent
Association football defenders
J3 League players
J1 League players
FC Tokyo players
FC Tokyo U-23 players